The 2016–17 LNBP season was the 17th season of the Liga Nacional de Baloncesto Profesional. The regular season began on October 13, 2016 and ended on February 11, 2017. The playoffs began on February 14, 2017 and ended with the 2017 LNBP Finals on April 3, 2017, after Fuerza Regia defeated Soles de Mexicali in six games to win their first LNBP title.

Regular season

Standings

Playoffs 

The 2017 LNBP playoffs began on February 14, 2017 and ended with the LNBP Finals on April 3, 2017.

References

External links

 
LNBP seasons
2016–17 in Mexican basketball by league